ScrollKeeper is a document cataloging system. It manages documentation metadata, as specified by the Open Source Metadata Framework (OMF). ScrollKeeper was used by the GNOME desktop help browser, Yelp, but has since been replaced by Rarian. It was also used by the KDE help browser and ScrollServer documentation server.

References

External links
 ScrollKeeper
 ScrollKeeper on SourceForge.net
 Open Source Metadata Framework

GNOME obsolete
KDE
Metadata